The Pilatus P-1 was a single-engined, single-seat training aircraft project from Pilatus Aircraft in Switzerland, ca.1941.

Design and development

The P-1 project began around the end of October 1940 as the first project of Pilatus, influenced by engineer Henri Fiert. The layout and design principles were carried through to the Pilatus P-2, which achieved success as a trainer with the Swiss Air Force. The fuselage structure of the P-1 would have consisted of welded steel tube, with removable front aluminium alloy panels and fabric covering aft of the cockpit. The wings would have been of wood built up around a one-piece wooden spar with plywood skinning.

Specifications (P-1 estimated)

See also

Notes

References

P-01
Abandoned military aircraft projects of Switzerland
Single-engined tractor aircraft
Low-wing aircraft